Jigsaw is a BBC show aimed at children between the ages of 4 and 7 that combined elements of puzzle solving and entertainment, which was broadcast from 16 July 1979 until 15 June 1984.

Written and directed by Clive Doig, the show was presented by mime artist Adrian Hedley, Janet Ellis and "Jigg" - a giant floating orange jigsaw piece, voiced by John Leeson.

Ellis left in 1983 to become a Blue Peter presenter, at which point she was replaced by Dot, played by Julia Binsted - an anthropomorphism of the "cursor dot" (the dot made by the raster-scanning beam in the analogue CRT television sets of the time).

Featured supporting cast also included Paul Clayton, Biggum the giant (played by Leeson) and Wilf Lunn who appeared as a mad inventor. Other unusual characters included Pterry, a puppet Pterodactyl (operated by Joe Barton); Cid Sleuth (played by David Cleveland), a Sherlock Holmes-looking bumbling detective plagued by a mysterious burglar (David Wyatt); Hector The Hedgehog; and the O-Men (Sylvester McCoy and David Rappaport), a pair of hapless superheroes summoned by saying any six consecutive words containing a double-O (even the same word repeated six times counted once, albeit inadvertently - Dot said 'coo' four times imitating a pigeon, then Adrian mocked her attempt, saying it twice more to trigger the summon). Arguably the most memorable supporting character made his debuting in Series 2. Mr. Noseybonk (also known as Noseybonk) was performed by Hedley in a dinner suit and a white face mask with a prominent nose and toothy grin. This last character has proved the most enduring due to him allegedly terrifying children as much as amusing them, and has been popularised by Stuart Ashen's series of Noseybonk Returns videos as well as later his appearance as Mr. Noseybonk in Charlie Brooker's Screenwipe, and was satirised as Mr Chuckleteeth in the X-Files episode Familiar.

Throughout the show, the presenters and supporting characters came together to solve a number of puzzles; these puzzles would then contribute to one larger conundrum that would be revealed at the end of the show. The viewer was encouraged to take part and solve the puzzles at home.

The theme music for 'Jigsaw' was composed by Martin Cook and Richard Denton (also responsible for the theme for Tomorrow's World) using a mixture of electronic keyboards and musique concrète. Cook would later compose a revised theme on his own. The theme used for the Noseybonk segments was "A Hippo Called Hubert," composed by Joe Griffiths and also used in Kentucky Fried Chicken's Charlie Chickenhawk and Frederick Fox advertising in Australia between 1984 and 1987.

Transmissions

References

External links
 

1979 British television series debuts
1984 British television series endings
1970s British children's television series
1980s British children's television series
BBC children's television shows
British children's education television series
British television shows featuring puppetry
English-language television shows
Television series by BBC Studios